Leon Vynehall is a British artist and producer. He released his second album Rare, Forever on 30 April 2021 via Ninja Tune.

Biography
After becoming a resident DJ at Akaakaroar, a Brighton club, Vynehall released several EPs on labels such as Well Rounded Housing Project and Aus. As a result of his productions, he quickly became an in-demand DJ.

His debut EP, Music for the Uninvited, was released on the label 3024 in 2014 to a positive critical reception, landing on numerous year-end lists in publications including Fact, Gorilla vs. Bear, NPR Music, Pitchfork, XLR8R and The Washington Post.

His second EP, Rojus, released on 1 April 2016, also received positive reviews. During this time Vynehall moved to the outskirts of Leicester.

On 10 April 2018 Vynehall announced his signing to UK independent label Ninja Tune. This coincided with the announcement of his debut full-length album Nothing Is Still, which was due for release on 15 June 2018. The inspiration for the album came from Vynehall's grandparents. Their emigration from the south-east of the United Kingdom to New York City in the 1960s, their seven-day journey via boat from Southampton to Brooklyn and other stories, only came to light upon the passing of his grandfather four years previous. The album also included a novella and set of short films. The first single from the album was "Envelopes (Chapter VI)", described by Pitchfork as "heart-rending experimental electronica", received coverage in a large number of notable online and print publications including NME, Pitchfork, Resident Advisor, Mixmag, Fact, XLR8R, DIY, Clash, Mojo, The Vinyl Factory and more. The track received widespread radio play on stations such as BBC Radio 1, BBC Radio 1Xtra, BBC 6 Music and Gilles Peterson's WorldWide FM.

According to Pitchfork, Vynehall's music combines the "percussive energy of contemporary House music" with "rich harmonies of sample-centric producers". Vynehall lists Aphex Twin, Afrika Bambaataa, Man Parrish and DJ Shadow as some of his major influences.

Rare, Forever, Vynehall's second studio album, was released on 30 April 2021 and received widespread critical acclaim from Pitchfork, The Guardian, Clash, Loud and Quiet, Resident Advisor, NME, AllMusic, and many other publications.

Discography

Studio albums 
 Nothing Is Still (Ninja Tune, 2018)
 Rare, Forever (Ninja Tune, 2021)

Singles and EPs
 Mauve (Well Rounded Housing Project, 2012)
 Gold Language EP (ManMakeMusic, 2012)	
 Brother / Sister EP (Aus Music, 2013) 		
 Open EP (3024, 2013) 		
 Rosalind (Well Rounded Housing Project, 2013) 		
 Butterflies (Royal Oak, 2014)
 Music for the Uninvited (3024, 2014)
 Midnight On Rainbow Road (Rush Hour, 2016)
 Rojus (Designed To Dance) (Running Back, 2016)
 Envelopes (Chapter VI) (Ninja Tune, 2018)
 I, Cavallo (Ninja Tune, 2019)
 Sugar Slip (The Lick) (fabric, 2022)
 Endless (I&II) (Studio Ooze, 2022)

DJ mixes
 Podcast 281 (XLR8R, 2013)
 FactMix 028 (Fact, 2014)
 Essential Mix (BBC Radio 1, 2016)
 .644 Leon Vynehall - 2018.10.01 (Resident Advisor, 2018)
 DJ-Kicks: Leon Vynehall (2019)
 fabric presents Leon Vynehall (2022)

References

External links
 Review of Music for the Uninvited in Resident Advisor
 Biography on Tailored Communication
 Official Facebook profile
 SoundCloud profile

British electronic musicians
Living people
Year of birth missing (living people)
People from Pembury